Wammerawa was an electoral district for the Legislative Assembly in the Australian State of New South Wales, created in 1920, with the introduction of proportional representation and named after an alternative name for the Macquarie River. It mainly replaced Mudgee, Castlereagh and Liverpool Plains and elected three members simultaneously. In 1927, it was split into Mudgee, Castlereagh and Liverpool Plains.

Members for Wammerawa

Election results

References

Former electoral districts of New South Wales
Constituencies established in 1920
Constituencies disestablished in 1927
1927 disestablishments in Australia